Over the course of its history, the LGBT community has adopted certain symbols for self-identification to demonstrate unity, pride, shared values, and allegiance to one another. These symbols communicate ideas, concepts, and identity both within their communities and to mainstream culture. The two symbols most recognized internationally are the pink triangle and the rainbow flag.

Letters and glyphs

Gender symbols 

The female and male gender symbols are derived from the astronomical symbols for the planets Venus and Mars respectively. Following Linnaeus, biologists use the planetary symbol for Venus to represent the female sex, and the planetary symbol for Mars to represent the male sex.

Two interlocking female symbols (⚢) represent a lesbian or the lesbian community, and two interlocking male symbols (⚣) a gay male or the gay male community. These symbols first appeared in the 1970s.

The combined male-female symbol (⚦) is used to represent androgyne or transgender people; and when additionally combined with the female (♀) and male (♂) symbols (⚧) it indicates gender inclusivity, though it is also used as a transgender symbol.

Lambda
In 1970, graphic designer Tom Doerr selected the lower-case Greek letter lambda (λ) to be the symbol of the New York chapter of the Gay Activists Alliance. The alliance's literature states that Doerr chose the symbol specifically for its denotative meaning in the context of chemistry and physics: "a complete exchange of energy–that moment or span of time witness to absolute activity".

The lambda became associated with Gay Liberation, and in December 1974, it was officially declared the international symbol for gay and lesbian rights by the International Gay Rights Congress in Edinburgh, Scotland. The gay rights organization Lambda Legal and the American Lambda Literary Foundation derive their names from this symbol.

Plants and animals

In 19th-century England, green indicated homosexual affiliations, as popularized by gay author Oscar Wilde, who often wore a green carnation on his lapel. According to some interpretations, American poet Walt Whitman used the sweet flag plant to represent homoerotic male love because of its phallic connotations.

The term , "rose" in Japanese, has historically been used in Japan as a pejorative for men who love men, roughly equivalent to the English language term "pansy". The use of the rose as a prominent symbol of love between males is supposedly derived from the Greek myth of King Laius having affairs with boys under rose trees. Since the 2000s, bara has been used by non-Japanese audience as an umbrella term to describe a wide variety of Japanese and non-Japanese gay media featuring love and sex between masculine men. The rose is also the sacred flower of Eros, the Greek god of love and sex, and patron of love between men. Eros was responsible for the first rose to sprout on Earth, followed by every flower and herb. Roses are a symbol of pederasty in ancient Greece: handsome boys were metaphorically called roses by their male admirers in homoerotic poems such as those by Solon, Straton, Meleager, Rhianus, and Philostratos.

Animals that lovers gave as gifts to their beloved also became symbols of pederastic love, such as hares, roosters, deer, felines and oxen, as a metaphor for sexual pursuits.

Violets and their color became a special code used by lesbians and bisexual women. The symbolism of the flower derives from several fragments of poems by Sappho in which she describes a lover wearing garlands or a crown with violets. In 1926, the play La Prisonnière by Édouard Bourdet used a bouquet of violets to signify lesbian love. When the play became subject to censorship, many Parisian lesbians wore violets to demonstrate solidarity with its lesbian subject matter.

White lilies have been used since the Romantic era of Japanese literature to symbolize beauty and purity in women, and are a de facto symbol of the yuri genre ( translates literally to "lily"), which describes the portrayal of intimate love, sex, or emotional connections between women. While not all those women were lesbians, and it is unclear whether this was the first instance of the term yuri in this context, an association of yuri with lesbianism subsequently developed. In Korea and China, "lily" is used as a semantic loan from the Japanese usage to describe female-female romance media, where each use the direct translation of the term – baekhap (백합) in Korea and bǎihé (百合) in China.

Lavender rhinoceros

Daniel Thaxton and Bernie Toale created a lavender rhinoceros symbol for a public ad campaign to increase visibility for gay people in Boston helmed by Gay Media Action-Advertising; Toale said they chose a rhinoceros because "it is a much maligned and misunderstood animal" and that it was lavender because that is a mix of pink and blue, making it a symbolic merger of the feminine and masculine. However, in May 1974, Metro Transit Advertising said its lawyers could not "determine eligibility of the public service rate" for the lavender rhinoceros ads, which tripled the cost of the ad campaign. Gay Media Action challenged this but were unsuccessful. The lavender rhinoceros symbol was seen on signs, pins, and t-shirts at the Boston Pride Parade later in 1974, and a life-sized papier-mâché lavender rhinoceros was part of the parade. Money was raised for the ads, and they began running on the Massachusetts Bay Transportation Authority's Green Line by December 3, 1974, and ran there until February 1975. The lavender rhinoceros continued as a symbol of the gay community, appearing at the 1976 Boston Pride Parade and on a flag that was raised at Boston City Hall in 1987.

Unicorns 

Unicorns have become a symbol of LGBT culture due to earlier associations between the animal and rainbows being extended to the rainbow flag created in 1978 by Gilbert Baker.

Alice Fisher of The Guardian wrote in 2017, "The unicorn has also done its bit for the LGBT community in the last century... Rainbows and unicorns are so intrinsically linked (the association is also a Victorian invention) that it's unsurprising that the magic creature started to appear on T-shirts and banners at Gay Pride around the world, with slogans such as 'Gender is Imaginary' or 'Totally Straight' emblazoned under sparkling rainbow unicorns."

Gay Star News has said unicorns are "queer icons of our time".

Triangle badges of Nazi Germany 

One of the oldest of these symbols is the downward-pointing pink triangle that male homosexuals in Nazi concentration camps were required to wear on their clothing. The badge is one of several badges that internees wore to identify what kind of prisoners they were. Many of the estimated 5,000–15,000 gay men imprisoned in concentration camps did not survive. The pink triangle was later reclaimed by gay men, as well as some lesbians, in various political movements as a symbol of personal pride and remembrance. AIDS Coalition to Unleash Power (ACT-UP) adopted the downward-pointing pink triangle to symbolize the "active fight back" against HIV/AIDS "rather than a passive resignation to fate."

The pink triangle was used exclusively with male prisoners, as lesbians were not included under Paragraph 175, a statute which made homosexual acts between males a crime. Lesbian sexual relations were illegal only in Austria and historians differ on whether they were persecuted or not, due to lack of evidence. Some lesbians were imprisoned with a black triangle symbolizing supposed "asociality", this symbol was later reclaimed by postwar lesbians.

Other symbols 
Symbols of the LGBT community have been used to represent members' unity, pride, shared values, and allegiance to one another.

A-spec (Asexual & Aromantic) symbols

The ace ring, a black ring (also known as an ace ring) worn on the middle finger of one's right hand is a way asexual people signify their asexuality. The ring is deliberately worn in a similar manner as one would a wedding ring to symbolize marriage. Use of the symbol began in 2005.

The Aro ring, a white ring, worn on the middle finger on one's left hand is a way aromantic people signify their identity on the aromantic spectrum. Use of the symbol began in 2015.
This was chosen as the opposite of the ace ring which is a black ring worn on the right hand.

Ace playing cards, due to the phonetic shortening from asexual to ace, are sometimes used to represent asexuality. The ace of hearts and ace of spades are used to symbolize romantic asexuality and aromantic asexuality respectively. Likewise, the ace of clubs is used to symbolize gray asexuality and gray aromantics, and the ace of diamonds is used to symbolize demi-romantics and demisexuals.

Freedom rings
Freedom rings, designed by David Spada and released in 1991, are six aluminum rings, each in one of the colors of the rainbow flag. Symbolizing happiness and diversity, these rings are worn by themselves or as part of necklaces, bracelets, and key chains. They are sometimes referred to as "Fruit Loops".

Handkerchief code

In some New York City gay circles of the early 20th century, gay men wore a red necktie or bow tie as a subtle signal. In the 1970s, the handkerchief (or hanky) code emerged in the form of bandanas, worn in back pockets, in colors that signaled sexual interests, fetishes, and if the wearer was a "top" or "bottom".

High five
There are many origin stories of the high five, but the two most documented candidates are Dusty Baker and Glenn Burke of the Los Angeles Dodgers professional baseball team on October 2, 1977, and Wiley Brown and Derek Smith of the Louisville Cardinals men's basketball team during the 1978–1979 season. In any case, after retiring from baseball, Burke, who was one of the first openly gay professional athletes, used the high five with other gay residents of the Castro district of San Francisco, where for many it became a symbol of gay pride and identification.

Purple hand

On October 31, 1969, sixty members of the Gay Liberation Front, the Committee for Homosexual Freedom (CHF), and the Gay Guerilla Theatre group staged a protest outside the offices of the San Francisco Examiner in response to a series of news articles disparaging people in San Francisco's gay bars and clubs. The peaceful protest against the Examiner turned tumultuous and was later called "Friday of the Purple Hand" and "Bloody Friday of the Purple Hand". Examiner employees "dumped a barrel of printers' ink on the crowd from the roof of the newspaper building", according to glbtq.com. Some reports state that it was a barrel of ink poured from the roof of the building. The protestors "used the ink to scrawl slogans on the building walls" and slap purple hand prints "throughout downtown [San Francisco]" resulting in "one of the most visible demonstrations of gay power" according to the Bay Area Reporter. According to Larry LittleJohn, then president of Society for Individual Rights, "At that point, the tactical squad arrived – not to get the employees who dumped the ink, but to arrest the demonstrators. Somebody could have been hurt if that ink had gotten into their eyes, but the police were knocking people to the ground." The accounts of police brutality include women being thrown to the ground and protesters' teeth being knocked out. Inspired by Black Hand extortion methods of Camorra gangsters and the Mafia, some gay and lesbian activists attempted to institute "purple hand" as a warning to stop anti-gay attacks, but with little success. In Turkey, the LGBT rights organization  (Purple Hand Eskişehir LGBT Formation), also bears the name of this symbol.

White knot

The white knot is a symbol of support for same-sex marriage in the United States. The white knot combines two symbols of marriage, the color white and "tying the knot," to represent support for same-sex marriage. The White Knot has been worn publicly by many celebrities as a means of demonstrating solidarity with that cause.

The white knot was created by Frank Voci in November 2008, in response to the passage of Proposition 8 in California and bans on same-sex marriage and denial of other civil rights for LGBT persons across the nation.

Flags

Gallery

Symbols

Simple icons

Flags

Encoding

See also

 LGBT slogans
 Pride flag
 Gaysper

Notes

References

External links

 LGBTQIA+ Glossary at Old Dominion University

 
Human gender and sexuality symbols
LGBT